The 1979 Portuguese legislative election took place on 2 December. The election renewed all 250 members of the Assembly of the Republic, 13 seats less than those elected in 1976.

The last election, three and a half years before, in April 1976, was won by the Socialist Party under the lead of Mário Soares, who became the Prime-Minister of the 1st Constitutional government after the revolution.

However, the government suffered several attacks and in December 1977, Soares lost the voting of a confidence resolution because all the opposition, the Democratic and Social Center, the Social Democrats and the Communists united in order to vote against it, and so, the Soares' government fell. Soares would become Prime-Minister again in January 1978, in coalition with the Democratic Social Center, but in July this party would force the end of the government due to disagreements about agrarian reform. In August, Nobre da Costa became Prime-Minister by personal decision of the President of President Ramalho Eanes, after a failed attempt to unite the parties on the Parliament. However, the program of Nobre da Costa's government was never approved and two months later, da Costa was replaced by Mota Pinto who would govern with extreme difficulties for less than one year.

In July 1979, the President finally decided to dissolve the Parliament and call for a new election for December. Mota Pinto was replaced in the period between the dissolution and the election by Maria de Lourdes Pintasilgo (the only women to lead a government in Portugal).

The right-wing parties, the Social Democratic, the Democratic and Social Center and the People's Monarchist Party united in the Democratic Alliance (Portuguese: Aliança Democrática or AD) under the lead of Sá Carneiro won the election, receiving 43% of the vote. The Socialists lost more than 30 MPs and the Communists, now allied with the Portuguese Democratic Movement in the United People Alliance achieved their highest total ever, with almost 20% of the voting.

Background

Leadership changes

PSD 1978 leadership election
The PSD suffered a lot of internal division after the 1976 election. The party was essential divided between those who want the party to pursue a more social democratic path, and those who want a more centrist to center-right approach, these aligned with Francisco Sá Carneiro. Because of these disputes, Sá Carneiro leaves the leadership in November 1977, and is succeeded by António Sousa Franco, who leads the party more to the left. But, internal divisions continue, and in June 1978, a group of 42 PSD MPs release the "Unpostponable Options" manifesto where they attack Sá Carneiro and reaffirm the Social Democratic path with the candidacy to the Socialist International. Sá Carneiro returns to the leadership in the 1978 July party congress and 37 PSD MPs leave definitely the party and form the Independent Social Democratic Action (ASDI), which will merge with the PS a few years later.

|- style="background-color:#E9E9E9"
! align="center" colspan=2 style="width:  60px"|Candidate
! align="center" style="width:  50px"|Votes
! align="center" style="width:  50px"|%
|-
|bgcolor=|
| align=left | Francisco Sá Carneiro
| align=center | 
| align=right | 100.0
|-
|- style="background-color:#E9E9E9"
| colspan=2 style="text-align:left;" |   Turnout
| align=right | 
| align=center | 
|-
| colspan="4" align=left|Source:
|}

A few months after the congress that reinstated Sá Carneiro in the party's leadership, the PSD, CDS and PPM reach an agreement to form the Democratic Alliance, in order to contest the following elections.

Electoral system 
The Assembly of the Republic has 250 members elected to four-year terms. The total number of MPs was reduced to 250 from the previous 263, elected in 1976. Governments do not require absolute majority support of the Assembly to hold office, as even if the number of opposers of government is larger than that of the supporters, the number of opposers still needs to be equal or greater than 126 (absolute majority) for both the Government's Programme to be rejected or for a motion of no confidence to be approved.

The number of seats assigned to each district depends on the district magnitude. The use of the d'Hondt method makes for a higher effective threshold than certain other allocation methods such as the Hare quota or Sainte-Laguë method, which are more generous to small parties.

For these elections, and compared with the 1976 elections, the MPs distributed by districts were the following:

Parties 
The table below lists the parties represented in the Assembly of the Republic during the first half of the 1st legislature (1976–1980), as this election was a national by-election, and that also contested the elections:

Campaign period

Party slogans

National summary of votes and seats

|- 
| colspan=12| 
|- 
! rowspan="2" colspan=3 style="background-color:#E9E9E9" align=left|Parties
! rowspan="2" style="background-color:#E9E9E9" align=right|Votes
! rowspan="2" style="background-color:#E9E9E9" align=right|%
! rowspan="2" style="background-color:#E9E9E9" align=right|±
! colspan="5" style="background-color:#E9E9E9" align="center"|Seats
! rowspan="2" style="background-color:#E9E9E9;text-align:right;" |MPs %/votes %
|- style="background-color:#E9E9E9"
! style="background-color:#E9E9E9;text-align=center|1976
! style="background-color:#E9E9E9;text-align=center|1979
! style="background-color:#E9E9E9" align=right|±
! style="background-color:#E9E9E9" align=right|%
! style="background-color:#E9E9E9" align=right|±
|-
| style="background-color:lightblue;border-bottom-style:hidden;" rowspan="3"|
| bgcolor="2A52BE" align="center" |
|align=left|Democratic Alliance
|2,554,458||42.52||||||121||||48.40||||1.14
|-
| bgcolor="" |
|align=left|Social Democratic
|141,227||2.35||||73||7||||2.80||||1.19
|-
| bgcolor="" |
|align=left|Democratic and Social Centre
|23,523||0.39||||42||0||||0.00||||0.0
|-
|- style="background-color:lightblue;"
| style="text-align:left;" colspan="3"| Total Democratic Alliance
|width="65" align="right" style="background-color:lightblue"|2,719,208
|width="40" align="right" style="background-color:lightblue"|45.26
|width="40" align="right" style="background-color:lightblue"|4.4
|width="40" align="right" style="background-color:lightblue"|115
|width="40" align="right" style="background-color:lightblue"|128
|width="40" align="right" style="background-color:lightblue"|13
|width="40" align="right" style="background-color:lightblue"|51.20
|width="40" align="right" style="background-color:lightblue"|7.5
|width="40" align="right" style="background-color:lightblue"|1.13
|-
|colspan="2" style="width: 10px" bgcolor="" |
|align=left|Socialist
|1,642,136||27.33||7.6||107||74||33||29.60||11.1||1.08
|-
|colspan="2" style="width: 10px" bgcolor=red align="center" |
|align=left|United People Alliance
|1,129,322||18.80||4.4||40||47||7||18.80||3.6||1.00
|-
|colspan="2" style="width: 10px" bgcolor=#E2062C align="center" | 
|align=left|People's Democratic Union
|130,842||2.18||0.5||1||1||0||0.40||0.0||0.18
|-
|colspan="2" style="width: 10px" bgcolor=yellow align="center" | 
|align=left|Christian Democratic
|72,514||1.21||0.7||0||0||0||0.00||0.0||0.0
|-
|colspan="2" style="width: 10px" bgcolor="" |
|align=left|Workers' Communist Party
|53,268||0.89||0.2||0||0||0||0.00||0.0||0.0
|-
|colspan="2" style="width: 10px" bgcolor=pink align="center" | 
|align=left|UEDS
|43,325||0.72||||||0||||0.00||||0.0
|-
|colspan="2" style="width: 10px" bgcolor=red align="center" |
|align=left|Revolutionary Socialist
|36,978||0.62||0.5||0||0||0||0.00||0.0||0.0
|-
|colspan="2" style="width: 10px" bgcolor="" |
|align=left|Workers Party of Socialist Unity
|12,713||0.21||||||0||||0.00||||0.0
|-
|colspan="2" style="width: 10px" bgcolor=darkred align="center" |
|align=left|OCMLP
|3,433||0.06||||||0||||0.00||||0.0
|-
|colspan=3 align=left style="background-color:#E9E9E9"|Total valid 
|width="65" align="right" style="background-color:#E9E9E9"|5,843,739
|width="40" align="right" style="background-color:#E9E9E9"|97.28
|width="40" align="right" style="background-color:#E9E9E9"|2.0
|width="40" align="right" style="background-color:#E9E9E9"|263
|width="40" align="right" style="background-color:#E9E9E9"|250
|width="40" align="right" style="background-color:#E9E9E9"|13
|width="40" align="right" style="background-color:#E9E9E9"|100.00
|width="40" align="right" style="background-color:#E9E9E9"|0.0
|width="40" style="text-align:right;background-color:#E9E9E9"|—
|-
|colspan=3|Blank ballots
|42,863||0.71||—||colspan=6 rowspan=4|
|-
|colspan=3|Invalid ballots
|120,851||2.01||2.7
|-
|colspan=3 align=left style="background-color:#E9E9E9"|Total 
|width="65" align="right" style="background-color:#E9E9E9"|6,007,453
|width="40" align="right" style="background-color:#E9E9E9"|100.00
|width="40" align="right" style="background-color:#E9E9E9"|
|-
|colspan=3|Registered voters/turnout
||7,249,346||82.86||0.6
|-
| colspan=12 align=left | Source: Comissão Nacional de Eleições
|}

Distribution by constituency

|- class="unsortable"
!rowspan=2|Constituency!!%!!S!!%!!S!!%!!S!!%!!S!!%!!S
!rowspan=2|TotalS
|- class="unsortable" style="text-align:center;"
!colspan=2 | AD
!colspan=2 | PS
!colspan=2 | APU
!colspan=2 | PSD
!colspan=2 | UDP
|-
| style="text-align:left;" | Azores
|colspan="2" bgcolor="#AAAAAA"|
| 30.0
| 2
| 3.1
| -
| style="background:; color:white;"|52.0
| 3
| 1.7
| -
| 5
|-
| style="text-align:left;" | Aveiro
| style="background:#2A52BE; color:white;"|56.7
| 9
| 28.4
| 5
| 7.9
| 1
|colspan="2" rowspan="11" bgcolor="#AAAAAA"|
| 1.2
| -
| 15
|-
| style="text-align:left;" | Beja
| 19.0
| 1
| 22.0
| 1
| style="background:red; color:white;"|50.7
| 3
| 1.8
| -
| 5
|-
| style="text-align:left;" | Braga
| style="background:#2A52BE; color:white;"|51.9
| 9
| 30.2
| 5
| 10.0
| 1
| 1.4
| -
| 15
|-
| style="text-align:left;" | Bragança
| style="background:#2A52BE; color:white;"|60.7
| 3
| 22.2
| 1
| 5.8
| -
| 1.9
| -
| 4
|-
| style="text-align:left;" | Castelo Branco
| style="background:#2A52BE; color:white;"|49.9
| 4
| 27.8
| 2
| 12.4
| -
| 1.9
| -
| 6
|-
| style="text-align:left;" | Coimbra
| style="background:#2A52BE; color:white;"|44.8
| 6
| 35.1
| 5
| 11.2
| 1
| 1.3
| -
| 12
|-
| style="text-align:left;" | Évora
| 26.9
| 1
| 16.9
| 1
| style="background:red; color:white;"|48.9
| 3
| 1.7
| -
| 5
|-
| style="text-align:left;" | Faro
| style="background:#2A52BE; color:white;"|34.6
| 4
| 34.0
| 3
| 20.3
| 2
| 3.2
| -
| 9
|-
| style="text-align:left;" | Guarda
| style="background:#2A52BE; color:white;"|60.6
| 4
| 26.3
| 1
| 5.4
| -
| 0.9
| -
| 5
|-
| style="text-align:left;" | Leiria
| style="background:#2A52BE; color:white;"|56.2
| 7
| 23.2
| 3
| 10.9
| 1
| 1.5
| -
| 11
|-
| style="text-align:left;" | Lisbon
| style="background:#2A52BE; color:white;"|40.0
| 24
| 25.8
| 15
| 26.0
| 16
| 2.8
| 1
| 56
|-
| style="text-align:left;" | Madeira
| colspan="2" bgcolor="#AAAAAA"|
| 17.2
| 1
| 3.1
| -
| style="background:; color:white;"|57.8
| 4
| 6.6
| -
| 5
|-
| style="text-align:left;" | Portalegre
| style="background:#2A52BE; color:white;"|32.1
| 2
| 29.8
| 1
| 29.4
| 1
| colspan="2" rowspan="9" bgcolor="#AAAAAA"|
| 1.7
| -
| 4
|-
| style="text-align:left;" | Porto
| style="background:#2A52BE; color:white;"|44.5
| 18
| 34.8
| 14
| 14.5
| 6
| 1.9
| -
| 38
|-
| style="text-align:left;" | Santarém
| style="background:#2A52BE; color:white;"|41.3
| 6
| 27.3
| 3
| 21.7
| 3
| 2.2
| -
| 12
|-
| style="text-align:left;" | Setúbal
| 22.3
| 4
| 21.4
| 4
| style="background:red; color:white;"|47.0
| 9
| 4.0
| -
| 17
|-
| style="text-align:left;" | Viana do Castelo
| style="background:#2A52BE; color:white;"|54.8
| 4
| 24.9
| 2
| 9.8
| -
| 0.9
| -
| 6
|-
| style="text-align:left;" | Vila Real
| style="background:#2A52BE; color:white;"|57.7
| 4
| 21.4
| 2
| 6.1
| -
| 1.5
| -
| 6
|-
| style="text-align:left;" | Viseu
| style="background:#2A52BE; color:white;"|64.1
| 8
| 21.4
| 2
| 5.5
| -
| 1.4
| -
| 10
|-
| style="text-align:left;" | Europe
| style="background:#2A52BE; color:white;"|38.3
| 1
| 33.2
| 1
| 13.4
| -
| 5.7
| -
| 2
|-
| style="text-align:left;" | Rest of the World
| style="background:#2A52BE; color:white;"|77.3
| 2
| 5.7
| -
| 3.1
| -
| 0.7
| -
| 2
|-
|- class="unsortable" style="background:#E9E9E9"
| style="text-align:left;" | Total
| style="background:#2A52BE; color:white;"|42.5
| 121
| 27.3
| 74
| 18.8
| 47
| 2.4
| 7
| 2.2
| 1
| 250
|-
| colspan=12 style="text-align:left;" | Source: Comissão Nacional de Eleições
|}

Maps

Notes

References

External links
 Comissão Nacional de Eleições 
 Centro de Estudos do Pensamento Político

See also
 Politics of Portugal
 List of political parties in Portugal
 Elections in Portugal

1979 elections in Portugal
Legislative elections in Portugal
December 1979 events in Europe